Lambs & Lions is the fourth studio album by American country music artist Chase Rice. After being delayed, it was released on November 17, 2017. Rice began a concert tour for the album on September 14, 2017.

Commercial performance
The album debuted at No. 42 on the Billboard 200, and No. 6 on Top Country Albums, with 12,100 copies sold in the first week.  It has sold 26,900 copies in the United States as of April 2019.

Track listing

Charts

Album

Weekly charts

Year-end charts

References

2017 albums
Chase Rice albums
BBR Music Group albums